Trinity College Kirk was a royal collegiate church in Edinburgh, Scotland. The kirk and its adjacent almshouse, Trinity Hospital, were founded in 1460 by Mary of Gueldres in memory of her husband, King James II who had been killed at the siege of Roxburgh Castle that year. Queen Mary was interred in the church, until her coffin was moved to Holyrood Abbey in 1848.

The original concept was never completed. Only the apse, choir and transepts were completed.

The church was originally located in the valley between the Old Town and Calton Hill, but was systematically dismantled in the 1840s (under the supervision of David Bryce) due to the construction of Waverley Station on its site. Its stones were numbered in anticipation of rebuilding and were stored in a yard on Calton Hill. Reconstruction did not begin until 1872, when it was moved to a site on Chalmers Close on the newly formed Jeffrey Street overlooking the original site.

Style

The church was built of local sandstone from a quarry only 500m to the west and was created in the Decorated English Gothic style. As was the taste of the time, water was discharged from the roof via gargoyles which were said to crouch in agony under the weight of their load. Unusually it is said the church had several monkeys within its decorations.

Income

Also as was the custom of the day, the income of the church was far more than that of a collection plate, and it received rental income from multiple remote sources. Either added by Mary of Gueldres at its outset (from her own allotted incomes) or added later by other arrangements. Incomes were received from Uthrogal (the leper colony at Monimail in Fife and the parish church of Easter Wemyss in Fife both from the outset. In 1502 a Dean and Sub-Dean were appointed, their income being paid by the parish of Dunnottar. In 1529 incomes were added from the parishes of Soutra, Fala, Lampetlaw, Kirkurd, Ormiston and Gogar.

Early history
The church and hospital of Soutra Aisle dedicated to the Holy Trinity, was held as a prebend of the chancellor of St Andrews. In 1459/60 the chancellorship was vacant allowing the dowager queen to supplicate Pope Pius II for the annexation of Soutra to her Trinity College foundation – the sanctioning bull was published on 23 October 1460. Queen Mary of Gueldres (widow of James II) issued a Royal charter on 25 March 1462 detailing the constitution for Trinity College in which the provost was to hold Soutra church as a prebend but had to maintain three bedesmen in the Soutra hospital. John Halkerston was made Master of Works.

In August 1463 Pope Pius II declared by Papal bull that religious visitors to the church during the feast of the Holy Trinity on 10 July and the following eight days, over the next five years, would be granted a plenary indulgence, if they contributed to the fund for completion of the building according to their financial ability. The money was to be put in a locked box with two keys kept by the Provost and the Papal Collector for Scotland. A third of the receipts were to be given to the Catholic church for its general work.

The church was famed for its triptych altarpiece by Hugo van der Goes completed in 1479, now displayed in the National Gallery of Scotland. The four surviving panels depict James III, King of Scots, flanked by St. Andrew and his son, the future James IV, and his wife, Margaret of Denmark.  The donor, the first Provost of the Trinity foundation, Edward Bonkil, and his coat of arms also feature.

Early records of the construction of the church are lost. In 1463 a steward of Mary of Gueldres, Henry Kinghorn paid the master of works John Halkerston for one account of his building work at Trinity Kirk. On 8 April 1531 the Provost Master John Dingwall contracted with a mason Robert Dennis that Dennis would work to complete the building for his lifetime. Dingwall wished to complete the church conforming to the choir. To help finance the building, James V wrote to the Pope Clement VII asking if Dingwall could grant indulgences to visitors to the church and college on the feast of Holy Trinity and Octave who made contributions to the work. After Dingwall's death in 1533, the masons pursued his legacy left for completing the work. Only the choir and transepts were finished. A nearby house, demolished in 1642, was called "Dingwall Castle" after the surname of one of the Provosts.

After the Scottish Reformation in 1560 the church as a building passed from religious control to the state. The congregation were rehoused in the North East Quarter of St Giles of Edinburgh. The building was refounded as a hospital for the poor in November 1567 by Regent Moray and the Provost of Edinburgh, Simon Preston of Craigmillar. Building materials for alterations were to be brought from the demolished Blackfriars monastery to the south. The master of work for building the new hospital, Adam Fullarton, sold stones, lime, and sand in the Blackfriars kirkyard to the masons Thomas Jackson and Murdoch Walker. In April 1568 the council sent four men, including Nicol Uddert, to find charitable donations for the hospital. The provosts (ending with Robert Pont) continued to have a financial interest in the structure until 1585.

From 1584 to 1833 it was the official church serving the north-east quarter of Edinburgh. In terms of structure (and conventional church layout) Trinity church was only a transept and apse, and lacked its nave.

From 1813 to 1833, the minister of Trinity College was the Rev. Walter Tait. In 1833 it was reported that he "had given countenance to certain extraordinary interruptions of public worship in his church on the Monday immediately after the communion by a person pretending to speak in the spirit". That person was said to be 'the apostle' Thomas Carlyle. Tait was deposed in that year and went on to become the pastor of the Catholic Apostolic Church in Edinburgh, until his death in 1841.

Lady Glenorchy's Church
see the separate article Lady Glenorchy's Church

In 1771 a separate chapel was built in the graveyard area to the west, and south of the old orphanage, paid for by Wilhelmina Maxwell, Viscountess Dowager of John, Viscount Glenorchy, generally known more simply as Lady Glenorchy. This small structure could accommodate up to 2000 persons and was also lost at the time of the ground clearance for Waverley Station, but also continued in both body and name.

Dismantling and Reconstruction

From 1834 the site of the church was earmarked for the location of a railway station by Act of Parliament. This also required the removal of the nearby Lady Glenorchy's Church, the old Edinburgh orphanage, and Trinity College (a separate building from the Kirk). James Bonar WS was an elder at Lady Glenorchy's and an Edinburgh lawyer. He drew up legal papers requiring the railway company to fund the rebuilding of each structure, and in the case of Trinity College Kirk, he argued that it should be dismantled and rebuilt rather than copied. The railway company were not used to such strongarm tactics but signed this, leading them to underwrite large parts of the cost of Lady Glenorchy's Free Church, relocated to Greenside 500m north, the Dean Orphanage on what was then a rural site to the west. The fairly unique plan for Trinity College Kirk required that the stones be numbered prior to demolition and then stored to await a suitable site for rebuilding.

The North British Railway Company paid £18000 in compensation, but this appears to have been paid to Edinburgh Town Council rather than to the church, and the council proved obstructive in releasing the funds for a new church, "hoping that the congregation would disappear" i.e. be absorbed into other churches. Bonar's legal agreements saw a timely rebuilding of Lady Glenorchy's Church as Lady Glenorchy's Free Church at Greenside, but there was a degree of truth that there was an over-provision of churches at the time. However, that was not the point, Bonar's legal agreement (and other parallel agreements of the time) required a new for old in relation to the Glenorchy Church, but the Trinity College Church was to be specifically rebuilt as an artefact. The emphasis was on its historic value not on its function. However, a House of Lords decision reversed a Court of Session ruling that all £18000 must be spent on the church, and limited the cost of the rebuild to £7000, the implication being that the Council had spent £11000 on other things in the intervening period. 

The gothic kirk, and its associated hospital, were demolished in 1848 under the careful supervision of the Edinburgh architect David Bryce, despite a formal protest from the Society of Antiquaries of Scotland, to allow for the construction of Waverley Station. David Octavius Hill and Robert Adamson photographed the kirk before its demise. The kirk was carefully dismantled and each piece of masonry was numbered with the intention of reconstructing the kirk on another site.

In the period between demolition and rebuilding the congregation still existed, but was split by the Disruption of 1843 which ironically resolved some of the problems. Those remaining in the established Church of Scotland, post-Disruption, were allocated the Calton Convening Rooms on Waterloo Place as a "temporary" place of worship. This was grossly inadequate in scale, holding only around 150 people. It is therefore likely that most moved to new churches within the 35 years of closure. Around 1857 the Town Council moved the congregation (ironically) to John Knox's Free Church on the Royal Mile (almost adjacent to its final siting) and in 1861 moved them to a corner of the internally divided St Giles Cathedral.

From a purely functional point of view the Council would certainly have seen the expenditure of £11000 on a church for only 150 people as a waste of money, but their hands were tied by the legal contracts. The chosen site linked to the City Improvement Schemes and in particular the new street at Jeffrey Street, and the medieval edifice was originally given pride of place, as the first building on Jeffrey Street. This seems to have been overseen by James Bonar, who was still alive, and still interested in the project. In a letter of 1873 a congregation member was highly critical of the town council for its inaction, and it was generally felt that the council sought to repress this non-conformist church, for its lack of connection to the established church, despite its importance as an antiquity.

Maps from the 1870s and one illustration in Grant's Old and New Edinburgh demonstrate that initially the whole church was rebuilt. The church opened for worship to the long-displaced congregation in October 1877 and held up to 900 people. The medieval font from the original church was repositioned in the church just before reopening.

As rebuilt the structure was turned through 90 degrees to face northwards. The northern section was largely a new invention. Despite the gargantuan effort to rebuild the church, through all the reasons explained above, despite theoretically holding 900 persons, it was at best one-quarter full. At some point in the 20th century the centre and north section of the church was demolished to create a warehouse on Jeffrey Street. There is some indication that the demolitions related to a "new church" by John Lessels and that the truly medieval section still survives. However, comparing the existing structure to the 1830s structure, although known thereafter as Trinity College Apse, this is a clear misnomer. The extant structure is largely the transept, but with southern windows from the apse.

Nevertheless. it is generally now called Trinity Apse. In the 1980s it housed the Edinburgh Brass Rubbing Centre, under the auspices of the City of Edinburgh Council. It is now privately owned and can be hired for wedding functions.

The rebuilt Apse, together with carved stone fragments and the boundary wall, is registered as a Category A listed building.

Its manse, built around 1870, still survives on Jeffrey Street.

Statuary and stone ornament from the church stand in the gardens of Craigcrook Castle in west Edinburgh (but it is unclear if these were moved at the point of demolition or "salvaged" during the period of being dismantled).

List of provosts
Sir Edward Bonkle or Bonkel:  1462 – 1495 x 1496
James Oliphant:  1499 – 1525
John Brady:  1502 – 1525
John Dingwell:  1525 – 1532 x 1533 (given a seat in the Scottish parliament in 1526)
William Cunningham: 1533 – 1539
Thomas Erskine:  1539
Robert Erskine:  1539 – 1540
George Clapperton:  1540 – 1566
Laurence Clapperty:  1566 – 1571 x 1572
Robert Pont:  1572 – 1585, who was paid 300 merks to resign the office to the town.

Source:  Watt & Murray Fasti Ecclesiae Scoticanae

List of ministers

Note:  One of the founding members of the College of Justice, John Dingwell, was Provost of Trinity College; and several Moderators of the General Assembly of the Church of Scotland came from the Trinity College Kirk:

1598 to 1616 - Walter Balcanquhal (1548-1617)
1626 to 1634 - Thomas Sydserf (1581-1666)
1639 to 1641 - William Colvill MA, translated to the Tron Kirk in 1641
1644 to 1648 - Robert Laurie, translated to the Tron Kirk in 1648
1649 to 1660 - Hew McKail/Hugh McKaile (d.1660)
1661 to 1667 - John Glennie (as assistant minister) went to Cashel in Ireland
1662 to 1673 - Joshua Meldrum (d.1673) buried in Greyfriars Kirkyard
1673 to 1675 - Andrew Cant
1674 to 1678 - Robert Laurie MA (d.1678)
1679 to 1689 - Andrew Cant (nephew of previous Andrew Cant?)
1687 to 1692 - Hugh Kennedie AM (Moderator of the General Assembly 1690-1692)
1692 to ? - John Moncrieff (d.1709)
1714 to 1756 - James Bannatine (d.1756) Moderator of the General Assembly in 1739
1756 to 1799 - Henry Lundie
1799 to 1801 - David Dickson
1802 to 1804 - Robert Anderson
1804 to 1810 - Robert MacKnight
1810 to 1813 - Rev Dr Andrew Grant DD 
1813 to 1833 - Walter Tait (1771-1841) moved to the Catholic Apostolic Church
1834 to 1843 - William Cunningham (1805-1861) Moderator of the Free Church of Scotland in 1859
1843 to 1857 - William Steven (d.1857) second charge since 1829 and Headmaster of George Heriot's School -minister of congregation in various temporary venues
1857 to 1860 - William Smith minister of congregation in temporary venues
1860 to 1868 - Robert Wallace, minister to the relocated church on Jeffrey St
1869 to 1870 - Cornelius Griffen, at Jeffrey St
1879 to 1908 - Alexander Kennedy (1840-1908) at Jeffrey St
1908 to ? - William Main (b.1867)

Second Charge
Not only was the church large enough to need two ministers but (more unusually) the second charge ministers often obtained fame in their own right including at least one rising to be Moderator. This is unique to Trinity College Church. This second charge was operational from 1597 to 1782, when the building of St Andrew's Church in the New Town took a large section of the congregation, no longer necessitating second services. Notable second charges were:

 1597 to 1604 - George Robertson, son of Patrick Robertson, Regent of Edinburgh University
 1625 to 1628 - John Maxwell MA, translated from St Giles
 1628 to 1629 - Henry Rollock MA translated to Greyfriars Kirk
 !634 to 1640 - James Elliot MA DD
 1641 to 1647 - William Bennet MA his son George Bennet became a baronet in 1671
 1648 to 1662 - John Smith (d.1667) captured by English Army in 1651
 1663 to 1668 - Alexander Cairncross (b.1637)
 1668 to 1689 - John MacQueen (d.1733) also Sub Dean of Chapel Royal
 1701 to 1708 - Archibald Riddell (1635-1708) son of Sir Walter Riddell, prisoner on Bass Rock and minister in USA
 1710 to 1719 - James Grierson (1662-1732) Moderator in 1719 (the second Second Charge to become Moderator)
 1732 to 1755 - George Logan (1678-1755) Moderator in 1740 (the third Second Charge to become Moderator)
 1758 to 1782 - Rev Dr Robert Dick DD MA (1722-1792)

Notable Burials

In the floor of the original kirk:

Mary of Guelders (1463) re-interred at Holyrood Abbey in 1840
Bishop Thomas Spens (d.1480)
Lady Sophia Ruthven (1592) first wife of Ludovic Stewart, 2nd Duke of Lennox
Lady Jane Hamilton (1596) first wife of Hugh Montgomerie, 3rd Earl of Eglinton

See also
Berwick Castle, most of which was also demolished in 1847, to allow for the construction of the Edinburgh – Newcastle railway

Notes

References
 Colston, James, (1896/1897),Trinity College and Trinity Hospital Edinburgh, Magistrates and Town Council Edinburgh, Edinburgh, 2 Volumes.
 Cowan, Ian B. & Easson, David E., (1976), Medieval Religious Houses Scotland, Longman, London. 
 Marwick, James, (1891), History of the Church of Holy Trinity and Hospital, Edinburgh, Burgh Records Society, Edinburgh.
 Watt, D.E.R.and Murray, A. L. (2003), Fasti Ecclesiae Scoticanae Medii Aevi Ad Annum 1638', The Scottish Record Society, Edinburgh.

External links

Photographs of a communion plate, 2 communion cups and 2 communion flagons associated with Trinity College Kirk, Edinburgh; National Museums Scotland
Archive of images of the kirk, held by the Royal Commission on the Ancient and Historical Monuments of Scotland
Image of Trinity Hospital, held by the Royal Commission on the Ancient and Historical Monuments of Scotland
Photograph of a transept window, University of Glasgow
Brass Rubbing Centre, the City of Edinburgh Museums & Galleries

 

1460 establishments in Scotland
Category A listed buildings in Edinburgh
Listed churches in Edinburgh
Church of Scotland churches in Edinburgh
Collegiate churches in Scotland
Former churches in Scotland
Royal Mile
Tourist attractions in Edinburgh
History of the University of Edinburgh
Renaissance architecture in Scotland